Beryani (also Romanized as Beryānī and Bereyānī; also known as Jāmīzeh) is a village in Pir Sohrab Rural District, in the Central District of Chabahar County, Sistan and Baluchestan Province, Iran. At the 2006 census, its population was 207, in 32 families.

References 

Populated places in Chabahar County